Samba Dirk-Jan Schutte (born 1 February 1983) is a Dutch-Mauritanian actor, comedian, and writer.

Biography
Schutte was born in Mauritania in 1983, the son of a Muslim Mother and Christian Dutch national. At the age of two, he moved to Ethiopia, as his father worked for a non-governmental organization. Schutte attended Sandford International School in Addis Ababa. When he was 12, his father purchased the video game Steven Spielberg's Director's Chair, and it was at this moment that Schutte decided to become an actor. In 2001, he moved to the Netherlands to study theater at the Utrecht School of the Arts. He visited Ethiopia for the last time in 2002. Schutte also began performing at comedy clubs and joined the Comedy Explosion, a comedy collective, in 2004. In 2006, Schutte won the Jury and Audience Award at the Leids Cabaret Festival. He toured the country doing comedy shows for several years. Schutte was a writer and presenter for the Dutch version of "The Daily Show" known as De nieuwste show.

Schutte moved to Los Angeles in 2011 to pursue comedy and acting, receiving the visa for Aliens of Extraordinary Abilities. Several months after arriving in the United States, he won a competition at The Comedy Store and became a regular performer. Schutte met his wife in Los Angeles, as she was the producer for a film he was auditioning for. Schutte has performed in several films, TV series, and video games, and has voice-over work for audiobooks. Schutte had a role in the 2016 film The Tiger Hunter. In 2019, Schutte was cast as Hakim in the TV series Sunnyside. His character is an Ethiopian heart surgeon who works as a taxi driver in New York until he gets a better opportunity. It was the first time an Ethiopian character was portrayed on an American sitcom. Schutte related to the role, as he was also an immigrant gaining a foothold in a new country.

Schutte speaks four languages: English, French, Dutch and Amharic. He suffers from the pigmentation disease vitiligo, but has managed to keep it under control after fearing it would be the end of his comedy career.

Partial filmography
2009: De multi culti story as Mohammed
2012: The Grind (TV series) as Samba
2012: Fatal Encounters (TV series) as Rais Bhuiyan
2013: Buni TV Comedy Series (TV series) as Dr. Mukakaka / Samba / Jazel Shah
2015: Uitzonderlijk Vervoer (TV series) as Samba
2015: Separated as Samba
2015: Borderline (TV series) as Brian
2016: Buddy Solitaire as Arash
2016: The Tiger Hunter as Kareem
2017: Je Maintiendrai as Samba
2018: Stellar Hosts (TV series) as Doug
2019: Sunnyside (TV series) as Hakim
2020: She's in Portland as Steve
2021: 9-1-1 (TV series) as Saleh
2022: Our Flag Means Death (TV series) as Roach

References

External links
Samba Schutte at the Internet Movie Database
Official website

1983 births
Living people
Mauritanian male actors
Mauritanian male writers
Mauritanian expatriates in Ethiopia
Mauritanian expatriates in the Netherlands
Mauritanian expatriates in the United States
People from Nouakchott